Gangster Land (also titled In the Absence of Good Men) is a 2017 American action crime drama film directed by Timothy Woodward Jr. and starring Sean Faris, Milo Gibson, Jason Patric, Jamie-Lynn Sigler and Peter Facinelli.

Plot
The film tells the story of Al Capone's rise in the Chicago underworld from the perspective of Jack McGurn. McGurn, the successful amateur boxer, joins the Italian Mafia after the murder of his father and rises within the organization together with his friend Al Capone. Business flourishes, but the Italians and the Irish mafia around Dean "Dion" O'Banion and George "Bugs" Moran begin a fierce battle for criminal supremacy in the Chicago underworld, culminating in the so-called Saint Valentine's Day Massacre.

Cast

 Milo Gibson as Al Capone
 Sean Faris as Jack "Machine Gun" McGurn
 Jason Patric as Detective Reed
 Jamie-Lynn Sigler as Lulu Rolfe
 Peter Facinelli as George "Bugs" Moran
 Mark Rolston as Dean "Dion" O'Bannion
 Michael Paré as O'Connor
 Sean Kanan as Detective Boyle
 Al Sapienza as Giovanni "Johnny" Torrio
 Tom Noga as Angelo Demory
 Don Harvey as Detective Landa
 Jean Kauffman as Josephine Demory
 Jason Brooks as Agent Wilson
 Ronnie Kerr as Franklin "Frank" Rio
 Drake Andrew as John Scalise
 Ryan Kiser as Peter Gusenberg
 Louis Fasanaro as Albert Anselmi
 Danny Hansen as Frank Gusenberg
 Kevin Donovan as Ben Feldman

Production
In June 14, 2017, it was announced that Jason Patric joined the cast of the film.

Release
The film was released in theaters and on VOD on December 1, 2017.

Reception
The film has a 0% rating on Rotten Tomatoes.

Dennis Harvey of Variety gave the film a negative review and wrote, "Given the gradually upticking arc of his opuses’ IMDb ratings to date, Woodward should finally score a 6 out of 10 sometime next year. He’s got the perspiration part down; surely inspiration can’t hold out much longer."

The Hollywood Reporter also gave the film a negative review and wrote, "Respectable period production values and some recognizable castmembers are no substitute for imagination in this flat crime flick, which steals freely from its predecessors but offers none of their guilty-pleasure thrills."

Noel Murray of the Los Angeles Times gave a negative review and wrote, "The ideal audience for Gangster Land would be someone who’s never seen The Untouchables or Boardwalk Empire … or, heck, even Guys and Dolls or Bugsy Malone."

References

External links
 
 

2017 films
2010s crime drama films
American crime drama films
American crime thriller films
Films about Al Capone
2010s English-language films
Films directed by Timothy Woodward Jr.
2010s American films